Chrisland University  is located in Abeokuta, Ogun State, Nigeria.  It was founded in 2015 and is accredited by the National Universities Commission.

References

External links

2015 establishments in Nigeria
Educational institutions established in 2015
Universities and colleges in Abeokuta
Private universities and colleges in Nigeria